Tell Maon (Arabic: Khirbet Ma'in<ref>{{cite book |last=Aharoni|first=Y. |author-link=Yohanan Aharoni |title=The Land of the Bible: A Historical Geography|edition=2 |publisher=Westminster Press |location=Philadelphia|year=1979|page=439 |language=en|isbn=0664242669 |oclc=6250553}} (original Hebrew edition: 'Land of Israel in Biblical Times - Historical Geography', Bialik Institute, Jerusalem (1962))</ref>) was a biblical town in the Hebron Hills, formerly known simply as Maon, rising  above sea level. The town, now a ruin, is mentioned in the Book of Joshua ( and the Books of Samuel.

History
The site is first mentioned as one of the cities of Judah.Freedman (2000), p. 854 Maon was the place of birth of Nabal the Carmelite. In , "the wilderness of Maon" is mentioned as a place of refuge for David when he fled from king Saul. The site is not referred to again in biblical sources, and only after the destruction of the Second Temple is there a reference to the site again, where Rabban Yohanan ben Zakkai is said to have gone up to Maon of Judah.Mekhilta of Rabbi Ishmael on Exodus 19:1

In the early 4th-century CE, Maon was mentioned in Eusebius' Onomasticon as being "in the tribe of Judah; in the east of Daroma." The name "Darom" (Arabic: ad-Darum) literally means "south," but in relation to the rest of Palestine it had the general connotation of the immediate territory in and around Bayt Jibrin (Eleutheropolis), as evinced by Al-Muqaddasi.

Archaeology
A synagogue dating back to the Talmudic period was discovered at Tell Maon. Archaeologists have also discovered at the site potsherds dating back to the early Bronze Age, as well as from the Israelite period (where jar handles were found bearing the paleo-Hebrew inscription LMLK (= "for the king") and from the Hellenistic period. Shards have also been found in situ from the Roman and Byzantine periods, and from the Middle Ages.

C.R. Conder of the Palestine Exploration Fund visited the site in 1874, during which time a brief description was written of the site: 
Tell Maʻîn –– A mound some 100 feet high. On the west are foundations, caves, and cisterns, and foundations of a tower about 20 feet square. The masonry in this tower is large, with a broad irregular draft and a rustic boss. One stone was 3 feet 8 inches long, 2 feet 9 inches high, the draft about 3 inches wide. There is also a round well-mouth, 5 feet diameter, cut out of a single stone.

Modern era
Tell Maon is situated SE of the Arab town of Yatta, on the north side of regional highway 317. Today, on the northern slope of the Tell are settled several families who have recently moved there from Yatta.

See also
 Ma'on, Mount Hebron

Further reading

 

Gallery

References

Bibliography

 

External links
Survey of Western Palestine, Map 25:     IAA, Wikimedia commons (Tell Máîn'' shown on upper part of map)

Book of Joshua
Books of Samuel
Hebrew Bible cities
District of Hebron
Judea (Roman province)
Ancient Jewish settlements of Judaea
Biblical geography
Ancient Jewish history
Archaeological sites in the West Bank
Ancient synagogues in the Land of Israel